The 467th Light Combat Aviation Squadron (Serbo-Croatian: 467. eskadrila lake borbene avijacije / 467. ескадрила лаке борбене авијације) was an aviation squadron of Yugoslav Air Force formed by order from March 7, 1978, at Cerklje military air base as part of 82nd Aviation Brigade.

The squadron was formed with 467th Light Combat Aviation Squadron from 460th Light Combat Aviation Squadron equipment, domestic-made Soko J-20 Kraguj counter-insurgency aircraft. By order from November 1976, in 1978 the squadron has been dislocated to Brnik airfield and it was reattached to 5th Aviation Corps as an independent squadron.

Squadeon was disbanded by order from April 15, 1982.

Assignments
82nd Aviation Brigade (1973-1978)
5th Aviation Corps (1978-1984)

Bases stationed
Cerklje (1973–1978)
Brnik (1978-1984)

Equipment
Soko J-20 Kraguj (1973–1984)

References

Yugoslav Air Force squadrons
Military units and formations established in 1973